Naked City is a neighborhood located in Las Vegas, Nevada north of the Las Vegas Strip The neighborhood is located at the northern end of the Las Vegas Strip, near the intersection of Las Vegas Boulevard and Sahara Avenue.

The most prominent development in the neighborhood is the Stratosphere Las Vegas hotel and tower. Upon its opening in 1996, it was hoped its presence would spur improvements in the area.

In May 2018, the apartment complexes in Naked City were renovated in an effort to reduce crime.

References

Geography of Las Vegas
Populated places established in 1950